Avions Kellner-Béchereau, known as Kellner-Béchereau, was a French aircraft manufacturer of the early 20th century.

History
The company was founded in 1931 by Louis Béchereau together with the French automobile carriage-builder Georges Kellner. The factory, located at Boulogne-Billancourt, began building light monoplanes. In 1936–37 Avions Kellner-Béchereau built a short series of small monoplanes exploiting one of Louis Béchereau's patents, a full span lateral division of the wing into two sections forming a "double wing".

The wing was first tested on the single-seat Kellner-Béchereau E.1 on 1936, which was followed by two larger and more powerful two-seaters, the Kellner-Béchereau EC.4 and ED.5.  Both of these were designed to meet the French Air Ministry's requirement for a pre-military trainer aircraft to be used by the clubs set up in the "Aviation Populaire" programme. The Kellner-Béchereau designs, however, were not ordered for the Aviation Populaire programme, the Air Ministry opting in favour of the Caudron C.270 and the Salmson Cri-Cri which were both bought in large numbers. Instead, Kellner-Béchereau, along with other manufacturers, built the Cri-Cri under licence.

On the eve of the Second World War, Louis Béchereau conceived a monoplane, the Kellner-Béchereau E.60, also known as K.B.E 60, an embarked monoplane for the aircraft carriers of the French Navy, but its development was frustrated by events.

In 1939 Georges Paulin, who in 1934 had designed the Peugeot 601 Éclipse convertible automobile, joined the aerodynamical department of the Kellner-Béchereau factory. A member of the French Resistance, he was arrested in 1941 and executed the following year. The Kellner-Béchereau factory was destroyed by bombing in 1942 and the Avions Kellner-Béchereau company was subsequently merged with Morane-Saulnier. Louis Béchereau was given a post as a director at Morane-Saulnier until his retirement in 1950.

Aircraft
 Kellner-Béchereau 23
 Kellner-Béchereau 28VD
 Kellner-Béchereau 29
 Kellner-Béchereau 30
 Kellner-Béchereau E.1
 Kellner-Béchereau E.4
 Kellner-Béchereau EC.4
 Kellner-Béchereau ED.5
 Kellner-Béchereau E.5
 Kellner-Béchereau E.60

References

External links

Defunct aircraft manufacturers of France
Vehicle manufacturing companies established in 1931
Vehicle manufacturing companies disestablished in 1942
Defunct manufacturing companies of France
 
French companies established in 1931
1942 disestablishments in France